The Entoniscidae  are a family of marine isopod crustaceans in the suborder Cymothoida. 
Members of this family are parasites of brachyuran and anomuran crabs, living in their hosts' haemocoel. A small chitinised hole develops through the host's exoskeleton through which the isopod can communicate with the environment. The female isopod bears little resemblance to any free-living isopod, but the morphology of the larvae show their taxonomic affiliations.

Genera

Achelion Hartnoll, 1966
Cancrion Giard & Bonnier, 1886
Diogenion Codreanu, Codreanu & Pike, 1960
Entione Kossmann, 1881
Entionella Miyashita, 1941
Entoniscoides Miyashita, 1940
Entoniscus Müller, 1862
Grapsion Giard & Bonnier, 1886
Micippion Shiino, 1942
Paguritherium Reinhard, 1945
Pinnotherion Giard & Bonnier, 1889
Portunion Giard & Bonnier, 1886
Priapion Giard & Bonnier, 1888
Synalpheion Coutière, 1908
Tiarinion Shiino, 1942
Xanthion Shiino, 1942

References

Cymothoida
Crustacean families